Karketu Dili is a Timorese professional football club based in Dili, that competes in the Liga Futebol Amadora, the top tier of the Primeira Divisão since its inception in 2016. The club wins the Premeira Divisão in 2017, finishing with a total of 28 points, 3 above runners up AS Ponte Leste. They also finished runner-up in the competition in both the 2018 Premeira Divisão to champions Boavista and the 2016 Premeira Divisão after only lost productivity goals than the league champions Benfica Laulara.

In 2019 Karketu Dili hired former Balikpapan Persiba coach Mr. Haryadi as the team's new head coach. Replacing Antonio Timotio after Karketu's slow start to the season, Hayardi stated that his main target is to bring the team to achieve better results.

Current squad 
As of April 20, 2019

Competition records

Liga Futebol Amadora

 2016: Runner-up
2017: Champions
2018: Runner-up
2019: 4th place

Taça 12 de Novembro
2016: 3rd Round
2018: Quarter Finals
2019: 1/8 Finals

LFA Super Taça 

 2017: Champions

Former coaches
 Arcan Iurie
 Shavkat Juraev
  Antonio Timotio
 Simón Elissetche

External links 

 Facebook Page

References

Football clubs in East Timor
Football
Sport in Dili
Association football clubs established in 2008